Sharon Mimer (born 6 September 1973) is an Israeli former association football player.

Career

Playing career
Mimer was brought up through the ranks of Hapoel Tel Aviv youth teams. During his army service, Mimer played in Hapoel Azor in Liga Bet, before returning to Hapoel Tel Aviv, where he played until 1997. Later, Mimer played in Hapoel Kfar Saba in the top division before moving to play in lower divisions until his retirement.

Management career
Mimer started his coaching career as an assistant manager to Nissan Yehezkel in Hapoel Rishon LeZion, where he also served as coach of the club's youth team. In 2013, Mimer, took over as the club's head coach after the previous coach, Eyal Lahman, was fired. Mimer saved the club from relegation and remained at the post the following season. At the beginning of the 2015–16 season, Mimer was appointed assistant coach at Hapoel Be'er Sheva. In January 2016, Mimer replaced Felix Naim as head coach of Hapoel Kfar Saba. Mimer was fired on 23 January 2017. On 6 February 2017, Mimer became the manager of Beitar Jerusalem. On August 16 of that year, Mimer was fired.

External links
Position Member Details – Mimer Sharon IFA

References

1973 births
Living people
Israeli Jews
Israeli footballers
Footballers from Bat Yam
Hapoel Tel Aviv F.C. players
Hapoel Azor F.C. players
Hapoel Kfar Saba F.C. players
Hapoel Ashkelon F.C. players
Hapoel Bat Yam F.C. players
Hapoel Nof HaGalil F.C. players
Maccabi Kiryat Gat F.C. players
Hapoel Rishon LeZion F.C. players
Beitar Tel Aviv Bat Yam F.C. players
Hapoel Marmorek F.C. players
Hapoel Bnei Lod F.C. players
Israeli football managers
Hapoel Rishon LeZion F.C. managers
Hapoel Kfar Saba F.C. managers
Hapoel Haifa F.C. managers
Hapoel Hadera F.C. managers
Bnei Sakhnin F.C. managers
Israeli Premier League managers
Association football midfielders